Buren Bayaer (6 March 1960 – 19 September 2018) was a Chinese singer, composer and journalist from Inner Mongolia. He was an ethnic Mongol.

Early life 
Bayaer displayed musical talent as a child. His parents and neighbors encouraged him to perform in front of the local community when he was six years old. His official musical education did not begin until age fifteen when he joined a school musical troupe. This is where he was introduced to different types of music including Mongolian songs, Revolutionary songs and Peking Opera. His song "Lucky Treasures", written in 1994, became popular in China. The song, originally, sung in Mongolian, was translated to Mandarin Chinese and was released shortly after.

Bayaer and his wife Wurina were directors of the Hulunbeier Children's Choir.  Uudam, their adopted son, was a singer in the choir. Their daughter, Norma, is a singer in China. Uudam and Nurma's cousin Enigma is also a singer.

Bayaer died on September 19, 2018, at the age of 58 due to a cardiac infarction.

Discography 
 1997: "Чандмань (Wishfulling Jewel)" - audio cassette
 "Миний аав Улаанбаатарт байна(My father is in Ulaanbaatar)"
 2011: "The Moon and The Stars" - , 9787799912707

Videos 
 "Take me to the Prairie"
 "Father's Prairie, Mother's River"

References

1960 births
2018 deaths
Chinese male singer-songwriters
People from Hulunbuir
Singers from Inner Mongolia
Chinese people of Mongolian descent